The Journal of Evidence-Based Integrative Medicine ((JEBIM)), published previously as the Journal of Evidence-Based Complementary and Alternative Medicine (JEBCAM) and also as Complementary Health Practice Review (CHPR), is a quarterly peer-reviewed medical journal that covers hypothesis-driven and evidence-based research in the field of alternative medicine. The editor-in-chief is Bruce Buehler (University of Nebraska Medical Center). The journal was established in 1995 and is published by SAGE Publications.

It absorbed Integrative Medicine Insights.

Abstracting and indexing
The journal is abstracted and indexed in:
CINAHL
EBSCO databases
Index Medicus/MEDLINE/PubMed
InfoTrac
PsycINFO
Scopus

References

External links

SAGE Publishing academic journals
English-language journals
Alternative and traditional medicine journals
Quarterly journals
Publications established in 1995
Evidence-based medicine